Aska (Sl. No.: 128) is a Vidhan Sabha constituency of Ganjam district, Odisha.

This constituency includes Aska, Aska block and 12 GPs (Subalaya, Kaniari, Barida, Paikajamuna, Sunapalli, Sialia, Nandiagada, Borasingi, Ambapua, Baliasara, Bolasara and Sunarijhola) of Kabisuryanagar block.

Elected Members

Fifteen elections were held between 1951 and 2019. List of members elected from this constituency are:
2019: Manjula Swain (BJD)
2014: Debaraj Mohanty (BJD)
2009: Debaraj Mohanty (BJD)
2004: Saroj Kumar Padhy (INC)
2000: Debaraj Mohanty (BJD)
1995: Usha Rani Panda (Congress)
1990: Duti Krushna Panda (CPI)
1985: Raghaba Parida (Congress)
1980: Raghaba Parida (Congress-I)
1977: Harihar Swain (Janata Party) 
1974: Harihara Das (CPIM) 
1971: Krushna Chandra Tripathy (Utkal Congress) 
1967: Harihara Das (CPIM)
1961: Lokanath Mishra (Congress) 
1957: Harihara Das (CPI) 
1951: Harihara Das (CPI) and Mohana Nayak (CPI)

2019 Election Result

2014 Election Result
In 2014 election,  Biju Janata Dal candidate Debaraj Mohanty defeated  Indian National Congress candidate Saroj Kumar Padhi by a margin of 23,499 votes.

2009 Election Result
In 2009 election, Biju Janata Dal candidate Debaraj Mohanty defeated Independent candidate Saroj Kumar Padhy by a margin of 29,986 votes.

Notes

References

Assembly constituencies of Odisha
Politics of Ganjam district